love is the only master I'll serve is a symbolical art film (22') written and directed by Nicholas Lens.

Festival selections
(World premiere) Brooklyn International Film Festival, New York City - June 2006
Media and Dance, Tokyo - Japan, 2006
Napolidanza, Italy, 2006
The American Dance Festival, United States, 2006
Media and Dance, Tokyo - Japan, 2020 (Best Selection)

Plot
One entity, divided into two women, addresses himself to an imaginary love-god represented by a pipe-smoking child. The body and voice of the divided entity are used to utter a spectrum of opposed sensations - caused by the division - and heightened sensitiveness related to the subject. The divided entity is seeking a unification, which will not happen without the approval and support of the imaginary love-god.

Characters
(Reference for this paragraph Festival program BIFF New York City 2006)

The Whisper Kid, symbolizes a personalized love-god.
she looks with a certain distance and neutrality at the two creatures who address themselves to her;
her image is of pureness and young innocence;
to cut across this well-spread definition she smokes a big curled hanging pipe;
sometimes she blows and creates air bubbles of soap with the inhaled smoke;
by these actions the child character reveals a mysterious, elusive background of her own timelessness, of someone who could possibly be aged but appears this time in a gentle, different form.
Luna, a human female mortal addressing herself indirectly (and sometimes directly) to the imaginary love-god.
she figures as a sculpture, perplexed by the whisper kid, but finally she looks straight in a static camera while she sings her ode to love, she expresses her devotion to the subject ("love is the only master I'll serve") by her self-chosen verbal communication;
her body almost does not move, we only see a severe, sometimes frightened, sometimes completely desperate-for-love face expression.
Serena, a human female mortal, addresses herself indirectly (and sometimes directly) to the imaginary love-god.
she communicates her devotion to the subject by physical expression;
she dances, using a whole spectrum of facial and body statements, interrupted with spasmodic blitzes of short falling moves and/or like electric shocks, like face and body are crying of pain and uncontrolled passion originated by the subject (as it appears sometimes when long periods of a constant energetic and inner peaceful mood is suddenly effected from outside, unexpectedly and on first sight unnecessary, like the pain of a needle in a body which is in a gentle, lovely sleeping state, a pain, abrupt and short, but more hurting, much deeper as one isn’t prepared for it).

Credits Production
Written and directed by Nicholas Lens

Cast
Louise Peterhoff - Serena
Claron McFadden - Luna
Clara-Lane Lens - The Whisper Kid

Crew
Photography and camera - Renaat Lambeets
Choreography - Louise Peterhoff
Music and libretto - Nicholas Lens
Art director - Pierre-François Limbosch
Editing - Simone Rau
Additional editing - Stefan Rijcken
Location - Karnak room, Axel Vervoordt, Wijnegem, Belgium
Shooting days - April 16–17, 2005
Executive producer - Brigitte Baudine
Presented by Tabaran Company
Produced by Nicholas Lens

Soundtrack
Music production:
The Accacha Chronicles 3rd part, Amor Aeternus - Hymns of Love, Nicholas Lens

Soloists
 Claron McFadden, Ian Honeyman, Henk Lauwers, Derek Lee Ragin, Elka Simeonova, Galya Haralambieva, Paul Gérimon, Clara-Lane Lens, Angelite -Bulgarian Voices

Recording and mixing
Acoustic studios - Sofia, Tabaran Studio - Brussels, ICP - Brussels, Villaïda - Casablanca, Bleu Nuit - Brussels, villalou - Cape Town
Distributed by Sony BMG Classics (CD 82876 66238 2, 2005)
Published by Schott Music International, Mainz/New York City

References

External links
 Biff, New York
 Schott Music International
 Internet Movie Database

2006 films
Compositions by Nicholas Lens